"I Can Lose My Heart Tonight" is the first single by pop singer C. C. Catch from her debut studio album Catch the Catch, released in 1985 by Hansa. It was written by Dieter Bohlen for Modern Talking, but he thought that it wasn't good enough for the band. It peaked at #13 in Germany.

"I Can Lose My Heart Tonight" was remixed and released in 1999 as a single, which peaked at #72 in Germany.

Mary Roos version
In July 1985, the cover version of Mary Roos called "Keine Träne tut mir leid (für eine Hand voll Zärtlichkeit)" was released together with the original, also produced by Dieter Bohlen.

Track listing and formats
Original versions
"I Can Lose My Heart Tonight" (Radio Version) (3:50)
"I Can Lose My Heart Tonight" (Extended Remix) (5:53)
"I Can Lose My Heart Tonight" (Instrumental Version) (3:53)

References 

1985 songs
1985 debut singles
C. C. Catch songs
Hansa Records singles
Songs written by Dieter Bohlen
Song recordings produced by Dieter Bohlen